Jeroni Fajardo (born 5 April 1985), is a Spanish International motorcycle trials rider. Fajardo was the 2002 FIM European Trials champion and member of the winning Spanish TDN team in 2004 and 2006 through 2015.

Biography
Fajardo made his international debut in the FIM European Championship in 2002, winning the title after victories in Italy, Norway and Poland. He also made his FIM Trial World Championship debut the same year, and by 2004 he was included in the Spanish TDN winning team, the world's top Trial De Nations team alongside Albert Cabestany, Max Freixa and Adam Raga. In the Spanish Championships Fajardo started making a name for himself, winning round 6 held in Vellameca, his first national win.

In 2008 he finished 4th in the world championships, a feat repeated in 2009 along with Fajardo's first World win in Andorra. He also finished in runner-up spot in the 2009 Spanish Trials Championship behind Toni Bou.

Fajardo made in onto the end of season podium in 2012, finishing 3rd in the World Championship behind Champion Toni Bou and runner-up Adam Raga. 2013 was a repeat finish of 2012 with the top three places identical as the Spaniards took control of the championship.

In 2014 he slipped back to 4th place overall, and was once again runner-up to Bou in the Spanish Championship.

2015 saw the World Championship results return to normal with a Spanish 1-2-3 of Bou, Raga and Fajardo. This was also how the Spanish Championship ended.
From 2006 to 2015 Fajardo has been a member of the Spanish TDN Team alongside Bou and Raga. They remain undefeated for the past 10 years.

For the 2016 season Fajardo is moving away from the Beta camp and has signed with the Vertigo team.

International Trials Championship Career

Honors
 European Trials Champion 2002
 TDN Winning Team Member 2004, 2006, 2007, 2008, 2009, 2010, 2011, 2012, 2013, 2014, 2015, 2018, 2019

Related Reading
FIM Trial European Championship
FIM Trial World Championship

External links
 https://www.jeronifajardo.com

References 

1985 births
Living people
Spanish motorcycle racers
Motorcycle racers from Catalonia
Motorcycle trials riders